The Orange Democratic Movement (ODM) is a centre-left political party in Kenya. It is the successor of a grassroots people's movement which was formed during the 2005 Kenyan constitutional referendum campaign. This movement separated in August 2007 into the Orange Democratic Movement Party of Kenya and the Wiper Democratic Movement – Kenya (formerly the Orange Democratic MovementKenya, known as ODM–Kenya).

The name "orange" originates from the ballot cards in the referendum, in which the banana represented a "yes" vote, and the orange represented a "no" vote. Thus, the parties demonstrates that it supported a no vote in the 2005 referendum. The original linchpins of the ODM were Uhuru Kenyatta's KANU party and Raila Odinga's LDP. While Kenyatta left KANU, Odinga remained and now leads ODM.

2005 constitutional referendum 
In the 2005 Kenyan constitutional referendum, the "no" vote, which the ODM campaigned for, won with 58.12% of Kenyans voting down the proposed constitution. Following this, President Mwai Kibaki dismissed his entire cabinet. The response of the ODM was to say that this was a step in the right direction and to call for an immediate general election, claiming that the Kibaki regime, which had campaigned vigorously in favour of a yes vote in the referendum, had lost its mandate.

Kibaki's government resisted this; elections were not to be held until the last week of Kibaki's five-year constitutionally-mandated tenure. The ODM emerged as a major opposition party, along with KANU, and organized a number of rallies asking for elections and a new constitution. The ODM also protested against the Liberal Democratic Party (LDP), which opposed the referendum, being dropped from Kibaki's new cabinet.

2007 elections 

After the 2002 elections, KANU was in opposition, while the LDP was a partner in the ruling NARC coalition until it was removed after the 2005 referendum. The LDP had supported no vote at the referendum, contrary to the policy of president Kibaki. Following their united stand in the referendum debate and responding to a threat by the newly formed Narc-Kenya party the leaders of KANU, LDP and some smaller parties decided to campaign jointly for the upcoming 2007 Kenya general election. They forming the Orange Democratic Movement, which was named after the symbol used to represent "no" in the referendum – an orange. An opportunist lawyer, Mugambi Imanyara, registered the name "Orange Democratic Movement" as a party before the coalition did, forcing them to use the name "Orange Democratic Movement-Kenya" instead.

As 2007 progressed the coalition proved unstable, with various factions defecting. Uhuru Kenyatta's KANU was the first, pulling out in July 2007 and endorsing President Kibaki's re-election, although some individual KANU politicians stayed with the ODM. Then, due to an internal rivalry between Kalonzo Musyoka and Raila Odinga, the ODM split into two factions in mid-August 2007. Raila's group, which also included Musalia Mudavadi, William Ruto, Joseph Nyagah and Najib Balala defected from ODM-Kenya and took over the ODM party registered by Mugambi Imanyara, while Kalonzo's group, led by himself and Dr. Julia Ojiambo remained in the original ODM-Kenya.

The two factions held their elections for presidential candidates on consecutive days at the Kasarani sports complex in Nairobi. On 31August 2007, Kalonzo Musyoka defeated Julia Ojiambo for the ODM–Kenya ticket, then on 1September Raila Odinga defeated Ruto, Mudavadi, Balala and Nyagah. There were allegations that some delegates voted in the nominations of both parties.

General election 

Raila and Kalonzo then faced president Kibaki in the general election. The International Republican Institute described election day as "generally calm, organized, and transparent". Kibaki was declared winner of the elections in circumstances that were described as "highly questionable" by various observers. Samuel Kivuitu, chairman of the now disbanded Electoral Commission of Kenya (ECK) could not explain why votes from nearby constituencies had not reached the tallying centre in Nairobi while those from far-flung parts of the country were tallied on time. Many polling stations had more votes cast than the number of registered voters. Maragua constituency, a PNU stronghold, turnout was 115%.

The ODM disputed the results. Violence erupted in the country with ODM supporters in Kibera, Naivasha and Nakuru being targeted for attack by Mungiki-supporting gangs, allegedly backed by police. PNU supporters were also targeted for attack by ODM supporters. People from the Luo ethnic group were shot dead in Kisumu, Kibera and Nakuru in large numbers while many ethnic Kikuyu were killed in the Rift Valley.

The ODM won the largest number of seats with 99 in the 210 seat parliament. It also won three out of five by-elections in early 2008. No sooner had the by-elections been conducted in the constituencies of two ODM MPs who were killed at the beginning of the year than two more MPs died in an aircraft crash. Some ODM MPs whose elections were contested in court lost their seats.

Political Parties Act and party elections

Following the passing of the Political Parties Act months earlier, the ODM held its internal elections in late December 2008 with Prime Minister Raila Odinga emerging as party leader and Industrialisation Minister Henry Kosgey as party chairman. Due to agitation over regional and gender representation, some party posts had to be created on the day of the vote. Raila has since fallen out with William Ruto, Ababu Namwamba, Najib Balala, and Henry Kosgey among others.

2013 general election
In the lead up to the 2013 general elections, the ODM entered a coalition with FORD-Kenya and the Wiper Democratic Movement to support a single presidential candidate, known as the Coalition for Reforms and Democracy

Electoral history

Presidential elections

National Assembly elections

Senate elections

References

External links
ODM leader's personal site
ODM Official website
ODM Official Community Portal
ODM 2007 Manifesto
ODM 2007 Parliamentary Candidates

2005 establishments in Kenya
Civic nationalism
Liberal International
Liberal parties in Kenya
Political parties established in 2005
Political parties in Kenya
Social democratic parties in Africa
Social liberal parties